Arash Kamalvand (born May 11, 1989, in Khorramabad) is a former volleyball player from Iran who played as an outside hitter for the Men's National Team from 2009 to 2013. Kamalvand was named Most Valuable Player in the 2011 Asian Championship ,

Honours

National team
Asian Championship
Gold  medal (1): 2011
Asian Games
Silver medal (1): 2010
AVC Cup
Gold medal (1): 2010
Asian Junior Championship
Gold medal (1): 2008
Asian Youth Championship
Gold medal (1): 2007

Club
World Championship
Bronze medal (1): 2010 (Paykan)
Iranian Super League
Champions (1): 2010 (Paykan)

Individual
MVP: 2011 Asian Championship

External links
 FIVB biography

1989 births
Living people
Iranian men's volleyball players
Asian Games silver medalists for Iran
Asian Games medalists in volleyball
Volleyball players at the 2010 Asian Games
Medalists at the 2010 Asian Games
People from Khorramabad
Iranian expatriate sportspeople in Kuwait